Ratko Đurković (born 9 February 1975) is a Montenegrin handball coach and former player who is currently coach of Crvena zvezda.

Club career
After starting out at his hometown club Lovćen, Đurković played for fellow Yugoslav teams Metaloplastika and Sintelon, before returning to Lovćen. He helped them win consecutive championships in 2000 and 2001. Subsequently, Đurković added two more championship titles with Partizan (2002 and 2003), before moving abroad. He would go on to play for Bidasoa (2003–2004), Pick Szeged (2004–2008) and Bosna Sarajevo (2008–2009), before returning to Lovćen.

International career
At international level, Đurković competed for Serbia and Montenegro (known as FR Yugoslavia until 2003) in seven major tournaments, winning the bronze medal at the 2001 World Championship. He also participated in the 2000 Summer Olympics. After the split of Serbia and Montenegro, Đurković represented Montenegro at the 2008 European Championship.

Coaching career
With Borac Banja Luka, Đurković won the Handball Championship of Bosnia and Herzegovina in the 2016–17 season.

Honours

Player
Lovćen
 Handball Championship of FR Yugoslavia: 1999–2000, 2000–01
Partizan
 Handball Championship of FR Yugoslavia: 2001–02, 2002–03
Pick Szeged
 Nemzeti Bajnokság I: 2006–07
 Magyar Kupa: 2005–06, 2007–08
Bosna Sarajevo
 Handball Championship of Bosnia and Herzegovina: 2008–09
 Handball Cup of Bosnia and Herzegovina: 2008–09

Coach
Borac Banja Luka
 Handball Championship of Bosnia and Herzegovina: 2016–17

References

External links
 MKSZ record
 Olympic record
 
 

1975 births
Living people
Sportspeople from Cetinje
Montenegrin male handball players
Olympic handball players of Yugoslavia
Handball players at the 2000 Summer Olympics
RK Metaloplastika players
RK Sintelon players
RK Partizan players
SC Pick Szeged players
Liga ASOBAL players
Expatriate handball players
Serbia and Montenegro expatriate sportspeople in Spain
Serbia and Montenegro expatriate sportspeople in Hungary
Montenegrin handball coaches
Montenegrin expatriate sportspeople in North Macedonia
Montenegrin expatriate sportspeople in Hungary
Montenegrin expatriate sportspeople in Bosnia and Herzegovina